Denmark competed at the 2020 Summer Olympics in Tokyo. Originally scheduled to take place from 24 July to 9 August 2020, the Games were postponed to 23 July to 8 August 2021, because of the COVID-19 pandemic. Danish athletes have appeared in every edition of the Summer Olympic Games, with the exception of the 1904 Summer Olympics in St. Louis.

Denmark stood with 108 athletes in 16 sports. Danish athletes won a total of 11 medals (3 gold, 4 silver and 4 bronze) at the Tokyo Olympiad. This was the most gold medals won by Denmark since the 1996 Summer Olympics, and the fifth highest amount of medals won in the Summer Olympics. Three of these 11 medals were won in cycling, two in canoeing and one each in badminton, handball, rowing, sailing, shooting and swimming.

Among the Danish medalists were Viktor Axelsen, winning gold in men's singles in badminton. He became the second Danish gold medalist in badminton, the first being Poul-Erik Høyer Larsen in 1996. Former gold medalist Pernille Blume won bronze in Women's 50 m freestyle swimming, marking her third Olympic medal in her career. Emma Jørgensen also reached three Olympic medals, having a silver medal from the 2016 Olympics and winning two bronze medals in canoeing at the 2020 Olympics. The Danish national handball team won Denmark's first silver medal in handball, having previously won four gold medals. Lasse Norman Hansen won his fourth and fifth Olympic medals, winning silver in men's team pursuit and gold in men's madison. This tied Hansen for most medals won by an individual Danish athlete, tying with Niels Larsen, Eskild Ebbesen and Lars Jørgen Madsen.

The Danish NOC represented not only Denmark, but also the constituent countries of Greenland and the Faroe Islands, neither of which have their own NOC. With the men's handball team winning a silver medal, Faroese handball player Jóhan Hansen became the first Faroese athlete to win a medal.

Medalists

| width="78%" align="left" valign="top" |

| width="22%" align="left" valign="top" |

Competitors
The following is the list of number of competitors participating in the Games:

Archery

One Danish archer qualified for the women's individual recurve by securing one of three remaining spots available in the secondary tournament at the 2019 World Archery Championships in 's-Hertogenbosch, Netherlands. On 8 October 2019, London 2012 Olympian and 2013 world champion Maja Jager became the first Danish athlete to be officially selected to the roster for Tokyo 2020.

Jager was seeded 25th after the initial ranking round, which left her to compete against Indonesian Diananda Choirunisa in the first tournament round. Jager won this round 6–2. In the second round against Ksenia Perova, Jager and Perova started out by winning a set each and had a set draw. Perova won the fourth and fifth sets, eliminating Jager from the tournament.

Athletics

Danish athletes further achieved the entry standards, either by qualifying time or by world ranking, in the following track and field events (up to a maximum of 3 athletes in each event):

On 27 March 2020, Rio 2016 silver medalist Sara Slott Petersen (women's 400 m hurdles) and steeplechaser Anna Emilie Møller became the first Danish track and field athletes to be named to the rescheduled Tokyo 2020 squad, with marathon runners Abdi Hakin Ulad and Thijs Nijhuis joining them nearly a month later.

Both the men's and women's relay teams broke the Danish national records, despite neither qualifying for the final. Silver medalist from 2016 Sara Slott Petersen competed in women's 400 m hurdles, qualifying to the semifinal after finishing 3rd in her initial heat. In the semi final, rain caused the field to get slippery and Slott crashed. As a result she didn't qualify to the final. Ole Hesselbjerg and Anna Emilie Møller competed in the 3000 metres steeplechase, men's and women's respectively. Neither qualified from their initial heats, Hesselbjerg finishing 8th and Møller finishing 9th. Møller's time of 9:31.99 was her season's best. Kojo Musah ran in the men's 100 m, as the first Danish athlete since 1928. He had reached the qualifying standard and was able to skip the preliminary rounds, moving straight to the round one heats. In his heat he finished in fifth place and didn't qualify for the semifinal. Two Danish athletes competed in the men's marathon: Thijs Nijhuis and Abdi Hakin Ulad. Both completed the marathon. Nijhuis finished in 70th place with a time of 2:26:59, and Ulad finished in 23rd place with a time of 2:15:50. For both men, this was their season's best.

Track & road events
Men

Women

Badminton

Denmark entered nine badminton players (five men and nine women) for the following events based on the BWF Race to Tokyo Rankings; two entries in the men's singles, one in the women's singles, and a pair each in the men's, women's, and mixed doubles.

In the mixed doubles event Denmark stood with one team consisting of Mathias Christiansen and Alexandra Bøje. In the initial group stage they lost two matches and won. Their one win was not enough to qualify to the quarter finals. Two other teams represented Denmark, one in men's doubles and one in women's doubles. The women's team consisted of Maiken Fruergaard and Sara Thygesen. They lost two matches in the group stage, but won against the fourth-seeded Lee So-hee and Shin Seung-chan. Kim Astrup and Anders Skaarup Rasmussen made up the team for the men's doubles. In the group stage they won two matches and lost one, which allowed them to qualify to the quarterfinals. Here they faced Chinese Li Junhui and Liu Yuchen. The Danish double won one set, as did the Chinese. In the final set the two Danes lost in a close 19–21 finish.

Three Danish badminton players took part in the singles events. Mia Blichfeldt competed in the women's singles, winning both matches in the group stage and qualifying to the elimination stage. In the elimination stage she faced off against Indian P. V. Sindhu, who she had previously competed against on five different occasions, four of which she had lost. She also lost this match against her, losing both sets. Two Danish athletes competed in the men's singles: Anders Antonsen and Viktor Axelsen. Antonsen won both matches in the group stage, qualifying him for the elimination stage where he faced off against British Toby Penty. Antonsen won both sets and the match, moving him on to the quarterfinals. Here he was to compete against Indonesian Anthony Sinisuka Ginting. Antonsen and Ginting each won a set, and in the final set Ginting defeated Antonsen 21–18. Viktor Axelsen also won both matches in the group stage, and defeated Taiwanese Wang Tzu-wei in the elimination stage. In the quarterfinal he defeated Chinese Shi Yuqi and in the semifinal he beat Guatemalan Kevin Cordón. This left him in a final against Chinese Chen Long. He won both sets in the final, winning him a gold medal. This was the first Danish gold medal in badminton since the 1996 Summer Olympics, where Poul-Erik Høyer Larsen won. Axelsen went through the Tokyo Olympics without losing a single set.

Men

Women

Mixed

Canoeing

Sprint
Danish canoeists qualified three boats in each of the following distances for the Games through the 2019 ICF Canoe Sprint World Championships in Szeged, Hungary. The women's kayaking squad, led by Rio 2016 silver medalist Emma Åstrand Jørgensen, was named to the Danish roster on 28 May 2021.

Sara Milthers and Emma Åstrand Jørgensen both competed in the women's K-1 200 m. Milthers finished 6th in the initial heat, meaning she had to compete in the quarterfinals. Here she finished fifth, which wasn't enough to qualify to the semifinals. Jørgensen meanwhile finished 1st in her initial heat, qualifying her straight to the semifinals. Here she finished 2nd, which allowed her to compete in the medal-giving final, where she finished 3rd and won bronze. Jørgensen also won bronze in women's K-1 500 m. She finished 2nd in the initial heat and 2nd again in the semifinals, then third in the final. She became the only Danish athlete to win more than one medal in the Tokyo Olympics. Julie Frølund Funch and Bolette Nyvang Iversen competed in the women's K-2 500 m. They finished fifth in the initial heat, which wasn't enough to qualify to the semifinals. They instead had to try and qualify from the quarterfinals, though finished fifth again and didn't manage to qualify to the semifinals. All four canoers competed together in the women's K-4 500 m. They came in fifth place in their initial heat, meaning they had to take part in the quarterfinals. Here they finished 6th, qualifying them for the semifinals. In the semifinal they came in fourth place, allowing them to take part in the medal-giving final race. In the final they finished last, in 8th place.

Qualification Legend: FA = Qualify to final (medal); FB = Qualify to final B (non-medal)

Cycling

Road
Denmark entered a squad of six riders (four men and two women) to compete in their respective Olympic road races, by virtue of their top 50 national finish (for men) and top 22 (for women) in the UCI World Ranking.

Kasper Asgreen competed in men's time trial. Asgreen had won the 2021 Tour of Flanders earlier in the year, and had competed in the 2021 Tour de France a month earlier. He finished 7th in the Olympic time trial, with a time of 56:52.21. Four Danish athletes competed in the men's road race: Kasper Asgreen, Jakob Fuglsang, Christopher Juul Jensen and Michael Valgren. Fuglsang, like Asgreen, had competed in the 2021 Tour de France a month earlier. Fuglsang finished the Olympic road race in 12th place, and Valgreen finished in 78th. Asgreen and Jensen did not complete the race. In the women's road race, 2 athletes competed: Emma Norsgaard Jørgensen and Cecilie Uttrup Ludwig. Jørgensen crashed during the race  and didn't finish. Ludwig finished in 10th place with the leading group of the race. Jørgensen also competed in women's time trial, where she finished in 17th place with a time of 33:50.18.

Track

Following the completion of the 2020 UCI Track Cycling World Championships, Danish riders accumulated spots for both men and women in madison and omnium, as well as the men's team pursuit, based on their country's results in the final UCI Olympic rankings. The track cycling squad, highlighted by multiple Olympic medalist Lasse Norman Hansen in the men's pursuit and omnium, was named on 2 June 2021.

The Danish men's pursuit team consisted of Hansen, Niklas Larsen, Rasmus Pedersen and Frederik Rodenberg. Julius Johansen was chosen as reserve. Larsen, Hansen and Rodenberg had all won medals in the 2016 Olympics. In the qualification heat of the team pursuit, the team finished in first place with a time of 3:45.014, setting an Olympic record. The first place finish qualified them for the semifinals, where they were up against the British team, made up of Ethan Hayter, Ed Clancy, Ethan Vernon, Oliver Wood and Charlie Tanfield. In the semifinal Denmark was in the lead, an on route to win the match, but Frederik Rodenberg collided with British Charlie Tanfield, who had fallen behind the rest of his team. The crew were supposed to announce that a British cyclist had fallen behind, and without the announcement that Rodenberg was not looking up and crashed into Tanfield. Denmark had already won the match when the crash happened, but the contest's crew had failed to end the race. The Danish team moved on to the gold medal race, while Great Britain ended in the seventh-place final. The Danish team went up against the Italian team in the final. The Italian team consisted of Simone Consonni, Filippo Ganna, Francesco Lamon and Jonathan Milan. Denmark got a time of 3:42.198 and Italy got a time of 3:42.032, both teams breaking the world record. Italy's time was faster, and their team won the gold medal while the Danish team won silver.

Two of the members on the Danish men's pursuit team also competed in other events. Niklas Larsen competed in men's omnium. He finished fifth in the scratch race, sixth in the tempo race, eighth in the elimination race and sixth in the points race, giving him a final placement of 5th, behind French Benjamin Thomas. Amalie Dideriksen competed in the women's omnium, placing 8th in the scratch race, 6th in the tempo race, 3rd in the elimination race and 4th in the points race. This gave her a final placement of 4th place, five points behind bronze medalist Kirsten Wild from the Netherlands.

The other member of the Danish pursuit team to compete in another event was Lasse Norman Hansen, who competed in the men's madison with Michael Mørkøv. They finished with 43 points in first place, winning a gold medal. Amalie Dideriksen, who competed in the women's omnium, also competed in the women's madison. She paired up with Julie Leth. The two of them won 35 points, finishing in second place and winning a silver medal. First place was won by British Katie Archibald and Laura Kenny with 78 points.

Pursuit

Omnium

Madison

Mountain biking
Danish mountain bikers qualified for three quota places (one men's and two women's) into the Olympic cross-country race, as a result of the nation's thirteenth-place-finish for men and fourteenth for women, respectively, in the UCI Olympic Ranking List of 16 May 2021. The mountain biking squad was named to the Olympic roster on 27 May 2021.

Sebastian Fini Carstensen competed in the men's cross-country. He finished with a time of 1:30:28, 5 minutes and 14 seconds after winner Thomas Pidcock from Great Britain. This gave Carstensen a 22nd place. Two Danish athletes competed in the women's cross-country, those being Malene Degn and Caroline Bohé. The two Danish cyclists finished in 12th and 13th respectively, with Degn's time of 1:20:34 being 4 minutes and 48 seconds slower than the winner Jolanda Neff from Switzerland. Bohé finished 23 seconds after Degn, with a time of 1:20:57.

BMX
Danish riders qualified for one women's quota place in BMX at the Olympics, as a result of the nation's ninth-place finish in the UCI BMX Olympic Qualification Ranking List of 1 June 2021.

Simone Tetsche Christensen was the only Danish athlete competing in BMX. She competed in the women's race. In the quarterfinals she finished in 2nd place, which qualified her for the semifinals. Here she again finished 2nd, and qualified for the final. In the final she finished in 6th place with a time of 45.582, finishing under Australian Lauren Reynolds.

Equestrian

Denmark fielded a squad of three equestrian riders into the Olympic team dressage competition by finishing fourth overall and securing the first of three available berths for Group A and B at the European Championships in Rotterdam, Netherlands. Meanwhile, two more riders were added to the Danish roster by securing the fourth of six available slots, outside the group and continental selection, in the individual FEI Olympic dressage rankings and by finishing in the top two, outside the group selection of the individual FEI Olympic jumping rankings for Group A (North Western Europe), respectively.

Dressage
The Danish dressage team was revealed on June 25, 2021. Charlotte Heering and Bufranco were named the team alternates.

The three Danish dressage athletes competed individually in the individual dressage and competed together in the team dressage. Cathrine Dufour and Bohemian finished in overall 3rd place after the Grand Prix, and finished 1st in their group, giving them a direct spot in the Grand Prix Freestyle. Carina Cassøe Krüth and Heiline's Danciera also won their group, giving them a direct spot in the Grand Prix Freestyle. They finished 10th overall in the Grand Prix. Nanna Skodborg Merrald and Zack place 3rd in their group, which was initially not enough to advance in the competition, but their score of 73.168 was high enough to qualify them to the Grand Prix Freestyle. In the Grand Prix Freestyle, Merrald finished in 11th place and Krüth finished in 7th place. Dufour placed 4th, finishing below bronze medalist Charlotte Dujardin from Great Britain. In the team dressage the Danish team finished 3rd in the Grand Prix, qualifying them for the Grand Prix Special. Here they finished in 4th place, below the British team.

Qualification Legend: Q = Qualified for the final; q = Qualified for the final as a lucky loser

Eventing
One Danish athletes qualified for eventing. This athlete was Peter Flarup, who had previously competed in the individual eventing at the 2008 Summer Olympics.

Peter Flarup and Fascination competed in the individual eventing, along with 62 other athletes. Flarup finished 34th in dressage, 47th in cross-country and 40th in jumping. This was not enough for Flarup and Fascination to qualify for the final, as only the top 25 athletes would qualify.

Jumping
One Danish athlete qualified for equestrian jumping: Andreas Schou with the horse Darc de Lux.

Andres Schou and Darc de Lux competed in the individual jumping. In the qualification stage they finished in tied 47th place, tying with Eugenio Garza, Emanuele Gaudiano, Roberto Terán and Jasmine Chen. This was not enough to qualify for the final.

Golf

Denmark entered two male and two female golfers into the Olympic tournament. The two men competing in the men's individual were
Rasmus Højgaard and Joachim B. Hansen. Hansen tied for 27th while Højgaard tied for 38th. The two athletes competing in the women's individual were Nanna Koerstz Madsen and Emily Kristine Pedersen. Madsen tied for 9th and Pedersen tied for 5th. Pedersen was three points behind silver and bronze medalists Mone Inami and Lydia Ko.

Handball

Summary

Men's tournament

Denmark men's handball team qualified for the Olympics by winning the gold medal and securing an outright berth at the final match of the 2019 World Championships in Herning.

Denmark was placed in Group B with Japan, Bahrain, Portugal, Egypt and Sweden. In the group stage, the Danish men's handball team went on to win their first four matches against Japan, Egypt, Bahrain and Portugal, while losing the match against Sweden 30–33. With this result, the Danish men's team placed 1st in the group and qualified to the knockout stage. In the quarter-finals the Danish team went against the Norwegian team and won the match 31–25. In the semi-finals, the Danish team won against the Spanish team 27–23, qualifying Denmark for the final. In the final, the Danish team went up against the French team. Denmark lost the match 23–25 and won the silver medal, marking the first time Denmark had won a silver medal in handball, having previously only won gold.

Team roster

Group play

Quarterfinal

Semifinal

Gold medal game

Judo

Denmark entered one female judoka into the Olympic tournament based on the International Judo Federation Olympics Individual Ranking, signifying the nation's return to the sport for the first time since Seoul 1988.

The country's qualified judoka became Lærke Olsen, who competed in the women's –63 kg class. In the initial round she went up against Canadian Catherine Beauchemin-Pinard. Olsen lost the match 00–10. Beauchemin-Pinard would end up winning the bronze medal in the tournament.

Rowing

Denmark qualified four boats for each of the following rowing classes into the Olympic regatta. Rowing crews in the men's single sculls and women's coxless four confirmed Olympic places for their boats at the 2019 FISA World Championships in Ottensheim, Austria. Meanwhile, two more crews (men's and women's pair) were added to the Danish roster with their top-two finish at the 2021 FISA Final Qualification Regatta in Lucerne, Switzerland.

Single sculls rower and current European champion Sverri Sandberg Nielsen was officially selected to the Danish roster for the rescheduled Games on 21 December 2020. The remaining crews that earned Olympic spots at the FISA Final Qualification Regatta were officially named to the Danish roster for the rescheduled Games on 1 June 2021, including Rio 2016 bronze medalist Hedvig Rasmussen and her newest partner Fie Udby Erichsen, a bronze medalist in the women's single sculls at London 2012, were named to the Danish roster on 1 June 2021.

Sverri Sandberg Nielsen, from the Faroe Islands, competed in the men's single sculls. In the initial heats, he finished first in his group with a time of 7:02.88. This qualified him for the quarterfinals. In the quarterfinals he finished first again, with a time of 7:10.52. This qualified him for the A/B-semi finals. Here he finished second with a time of 6:44.00, finishing 2.4 second after Greek Stefanos Ntouskos. His second place qualified him for the medal-giving A-final. In the final, he finished with a time of 6:42.73. Ntouskos won the gold medal with a time of 6:40.45, while Norwegian Kjetil Borch won the silver medal. Croatian Damir Martin won the bronze medal, finishing 0.15 seconds before Nielsen, who finished the competition in fourth place.

Two Danish teams competed in the coxless pair discipline, one for each gender. In the men's coxless pair the athletes were Joachim Sutton and Frederik Vystavel. In the initial heats, the pair finished second in their group with a time of 6:36.93. This qualified them for the A/B-semi finals where they finished in second place again, this time with a time of 6:14.88. This qualified them for the medal-giving A-final. Here they finished in third place with a time of 6:19.88, winning them the bronze medal. Croatians Sinković & Sinković won the gold medal and Romanian Cozmiuc & Tudosă won the silver medal. The Danish athletes competing in the women's coxless pair were Fie Udby Erichsen and Hedvig Rasmussen. In the initial heats, they finished second in their group with a time of 7:22.86. This qualified them for the A/B-semi finals. In the semi final they finished with a time of 7:08.44, finishing in last place in their group. This meant that they would qualify for the B-final, which would not give a medal. They finished in second place in the B-final, with a time of 6:59.48. This gave them eight place overall in the tournament.

Four athletes made up the Danish team competing in the women's coxless four. This team consisted of Ida Gørtz Jacobsen, Christina Juhl Johansen, Frida Sanggaard Nielsen and Trine Dahl Pedersen. In the initial heats, the team finished last in their group. Their time in the heat was 6:50.15. This meant they had to compete in the repechage for a chance to go to the medal-giving A-final. In the repechage they finished last again, however, with a time of 7:01.17. This left the team to compete in the B-final, where they finished second with a time of 6:34.72. This game them an overall eight placement in the tournament.

Men

Women

Qualification Legend: FA=Final A (medal); FB=Final B (non-medal); FC=Final C (non-medal); FD=Final D (non-medal); FE=Final E (non-medal); FF=Final F (non-medal); SA/B=Semifinals A/B; SC/D=Semifinals C/D; SE/F=Semifinals E/F; QF=Quarterfinals; R=Repechage

Sailing

Danish sailors qualified one boat in each of the following classes through the 2018 Sailing World Championships, the class-associated Worlds, and the continental regattas.

On 27 March 2020, Team Denmark announced the first set of sailors (49er, 49erFX, and Nacra 17 crews) selected for the rescheduled Games, including Beijing 2008 gold medalist Jonas Warrer. Rio 2016 windsurfer Lærke Buhl-Hansen, with Laser sailor and bronze medalist Anne-Marie Rindom going to her third consecutive Games, was added to the Danish sailing roster on 12 May 2020.

Men

Women

Mixed

M = Medal race; EL = Eliminated – did not advance into the medal race

Shooting

Danish shooters achieved quota places for the following events by virtue of their best finishes at the 2018 ISSF World Championships, the 2019 ISSF World Cup series, European Championships or Games, and European Qualifying Tournament, as long as they obtained a minimum qualifying score (MQS) by 31 May 2020.

Skeet shooter and 2013 world shotgun champion Jesper Hansen was officially selected to the Danish roster for his third consecutive Games on 14 November 2019. Steffen Olsen earned a direct place in the men's 50 m rifle 3 positions for the rescheduled Games as the highest-ranked shooter vying for qualification in the ISSF World Olympic Rankings of 6 June 2021.

Skateboarding

Swimming

Men

Women

Table tennis
 
Denmark entered one athlete into the table tennis competition at the Games. Rio 2016 Olympian Jonathan Groth scored an outright semifinal victory to book one of three Olympic spots available in the men's singles at the 2019 European Games in Minsk, Belarus.

Wrestling

Denmark qualified one wrestler for the men's Greco-Roman 67 kg into the Olympic competition, as a result of his top six finish at the 2019 World Championships.

Greco-Roman

References

Nations at the 2020 Summer Olympics
2020
2020 in Danish sport